Pufești is a commune located in Vrancea County, Romania. It is composed of four villages: Ciorani, Domnești-Sat, Domnești-Târg and Pufești.

The Domnești Princely Church is located in Domnești-Târg.

References

Communes in Vrancea County
Localities in Western Moldavia